Joseph James Fletcher (7 January 1850 – 15 May 1926) was an Australian biologist, winner of the 1921 Clarke Medal.

Fletcher was born at Auckland, New Zealand the son of the Rev Joseph Horner Fletcher, a Methodist clergyman, and his wife Kate, née Green. The family arrived in Australia early in 1861, and, after a term of four years in Queensland (where Joseph James studied at Ipswich Grammar School), Rev. Fletcher went to Sydney to become principal of Newington College, from 1865 to 1887. J. J. Fletcher completed his schooling at Newington (1865–1867) and then went to the University of Sydney and graduating BA in 1870 and MA in 1876. In between these years he was a master at Wesley College, Melbourne, under Professor M. H. Irving. As no science degree was offered in Australia, in 1876 resigned from Wesley and went to London, initially studying at the Royal School of Mines and University College, University of London where he studied biology and took his BSc degree there in 1879. He studied for a time at Cambridge and in 1881 published his first paper.

In 1881 Fletcher decided to return to Australia, and, before leaving England, prepared a Catalogue of Papers and Works relating to the Mammalian orders, Marsupialla and Monotremata, which was published in Sydney soon after his arrival. There were no openings for young scientists in Sydney at this period, so Fletcher joined the staff of Newington College where his father was still principal. He spent four years at the school and was a successful teacher, encouraging his pupils to find out things for themselves instead of merely trying to remember what their teacher had told them. During this period he joined the Linnean Society of New South Wales, met Sir William Macleay, and in 1885 was given the position of director and librarian of the society. This title was afterwards changed to secretary. He began his duties on 1 January 1886 and for over 33 years devoted his life to the service of the society. During this period he edited 33 volumes of Proceedings with the greatest care.

Fletcher also published in 1892 a selection of Sermons, Addresses and Essays by his father, with a biographical sketch, and in 1893 edited The Macleay Memorial Volume, for which he wrote an excellent memoir of Macleay. He had done some very good research work in connexion with the embryology of the marsupials, and on Australian earthworms. Later he took up the amphibia, on which he eventually became an authority. In January 1900, he was president of the biology section at the meeting of the Australasian Association for the Advancement of Science, and chose for the subject of his address "The Rise and early Progress of our Knowledge of the Australian Fauna", a work of much value to all interested in the history of research in the natural history of Australia. In addition to being secretary of the Linnean Society and editor of its Proceedings, Fletcher was an executor of Macleay's will and he had much work in carrying out the provisions of it as financial and legal difficulties arose in connexion with the appointment of a bacteriologist and the foundation of the research fellowships.

In his later years Fletcher gave more and more time to botany, and did important work on acacias, grevilleas and Loranthaceae. On 31 March 1919 he resigned his position as secretary to the Linnean Society and was elected president in 1920 and 1921. His address on "The Society's Heritage from the Macleays", a very interesting record, occupies nearly 70 pages in volume XLV of the Proceedings. After an accident in 1922 he was much confined to his home for the remainder of his life. He overhauled and completed the arranging and labelling of his own zoological collection in 1923 before presenting it to the Australian Museum. Fletcher also gave more than 300 books and pamphlets to the Mitchell Library. Fletcher died suddenly at his home in Hunters Hill, New South Wales on 15 May 1926, leaving a widow. Fletcher was awarded the Clarke Medal by the Royal Society of New South Wales in 1921.

His contribution to Australian herpetology is suggested to have been as an important catalyst amongst his contemporaries in  assembling records and collections of Australian reptiles and amphibians, a neglected area of research. These efforts were particularly noted for his association with the Horn expedition to central Australia.

References

Bibliography
David Macmillan, Newington College 1863–1963 (Sydney, 1963)
Peter Swain, Newington Across the Years 1863–1998 (Sydney, 1999)

External links

G. P. Walsh, 'Fletcher, Joseph James (1850? – 1926)', Australian Dictionary of Biography, Volume 8, MUP, 1981, pp 525–526. Retrieved 21 October 2008

1850 births
1926 deaths
Australian Methodists
Australian zoologists
Staff of Newington College
People educated at Newington College
Alumni of University College London
Alumni of the University of Cambridge